Marco d'Almeida is a Mozambique-born Portuguese actor born on April 27, 1975. He was the male star in Beauty and the Paparazzo, the highest-grossing Portuguese film in 2010.

References

External links 

Living people
1975 births